Maria Elena Camerin and Gisela Dulko were the defending champions, but chose not to participate that year.

Bethanie Mattek and Sania Mirza won in the final 7–6(7–4), 7–5, against Alina Jidkova and Tatiana Poutchek.

Seeds

Draw

{{16TeamBracket-Compact-Tennis3-Byes
| RD1= First round
| RD2= Quarterfinals
| RD3= Semifinals
| RD4= Final
| RD1-seed01=1
| RD1-team01= B Mattek S Mirza
| RD1-score01-1=6
| RD1-score01-2=6
| RD1-score01-3= 
| RD1-seed02= 
| RD1-team02= C Castaño M Yuan
| RD1-score02-1=4
| RD1-score02-2=0
| RD1-score02-3= 
| RD1-seed03=WC
| RD1-team03= K Flower C-y Hsu
| RD1-score03-1=2
| RD1-score03-2=1
| RD1-score03-3= 
| RD1-seed04= 
| RD1-team04= L Osterloh A Rodionova
| RD1-score04-1=6
| RD1-score04-2=6
| RD1-score04-3= 
| RD1-seed05=4
| RD1-team05= L Baker N Kriz
| RD1-score05-1=63
| RD1-score05-2=7
| RD1-score05-3=[8]
| RD1-seed06= 
| RD1-team06=

External links 
Draw

Doubles